Roger Milliken (October 24, 1915 – December 30, 2010) was an American textile heir, industrialist, businessman, and political activist. He served as President and then CEO of his family's company, Milliken & Company, from 1947 until 2005. He continued to serve as Chairman of the Board until his death in 2010. Milliken is known as a political godfather to the American conservative movement.

Company background

Deering Milliken Company was co-founded by Roger's grandfather, Seth Minot Milliken, and William Deering in 1865. The small woolens fabric company was initially based in Portland, Maine, but moved to New York City in 1868 after William Deering left Deering Milliken to start the Deering Harvester company. Deering Harvester later merged with the McCormick Harvester Company to form International Harvester. There is a surviving spinoff of International Harvester (which is today known as Navistar International). In 1884, Deering Milliken Company invested in its first property near Spartanburg, South Carolina, where the company's headquarters have been based since 1958. In 1976, Deering Milliken officially became Milliken & Company.

Personal life
Milliken was born October 24, 1915, in New York City, the eldest son of Gerrish Hill Milliken and Agnes Malcolm (née Gayley) Milliken. Roger's grandfather was Seth Milliken, co-founder of what is today known as Milliken & Company. He attended Yale University, where he studied French history and graduated in 1937. After graduation, he started out in New York City’s Mercantile Stores, in which his family had an ownership stake. Roger's brother Gerrish H. Milliken was married to Phoebe Thayer Milliken née Goodhue, the daughter of the banker F. Abott Goodhue.

In 1941, he was given the stewardship of three small woolen-producing mills in Maine. When his father, Gerrish, died in 1947, the 32-year-old Milliken succeeded him as president.

Milliken died on December 30, 2010. Funeral services were held at Church of the Advent and he was buried at Greenlawn Memorial Gardens of Spartanburg.

Family
Milliken met his future wife, Justine van Rensselaer Hooper, at a dinner party. They married in 1948 and had five children. Justine died in 2003.

Milliken's son Weston is an openly gay man, liberal activist, and member of the Democracy Alliance that is dedicated to advancing the rights of organized labor, people of color, women, and LGBT people in Southern states. Weston's activism has been described as "clearly avenging the sins of the father."

Activism

The Milliken family was active in the community, Roger serving on the board of Wofford College and Justine on the board of Converse College. Milliken also served on other corporate and nonprofit boards, including Arthur D. Little, Westinghouse, Citicorp, Mercantile, W.R. Grace, Institute of Textile Technology, Heritage Foundation, the Greenville-Spartanburg Airport Commission, and the Spartanburg Day School.

Milliken was vehemently Anti-Union, closing the Darlington Manufacturing Company after workers there voted to unionize in 1956.

Politics
He was president of Milliken & Company until 1983, when he became chairman and CEO. He relinquished the CEO title in 2005, and remained chairman until his death. Starting in the 1950s, Milliken helped build the South Carolina Republican Party, which had been in the minority for decades. Milliken helped convince South Carolina Senator Strom Thurmond to switch to the Republican Party.

Milliken raised the money for the "Senator Thurmond Speaks for Nixon-Agnew" commercials that formed part of Nixon's Southern Strategy of attracting white Southerners to the Republican Party in the 1968 Presidential election. He was a notable donor to conservative causes. He supported National Review, the [western goals foundation],the John Birch Society, Barry Goldwater, Ronald Reagan, and Pat Buchanan, among others.

References

External links
 entry in 2008 Forbes richest people
 Roger Milliken on Forbes World's Richest People, 2003
 Milliken Entry in National Textile Association Textile Industry Who's Who
 Remembrance of Milliken from Patrick Buchanan
 Milliken obituary from Spartanburg Herald-Journal newspaper online

1915 births
2010 deaths
20th-century American businesspeople
American anti-communists
American Episcopalians
American textile industry businesspeople
Anti-union sentiment
Businesspeople from New York City
Businesspeople from South Carolina
John Birch Society members
Milliken family
South Carolina Republicans
Yale University alumni
The Heritage Foundation